The 2019–20 Wyoming Cowboys basketball team represented the University of Wyoming during the 2019–20 NCAA Division I men's basketball season. They were led by Allen Edwards in his fourth and final year as head coach at Wyoming. The Cowboys played their home games at the Arena-Auditorium in Laramie, Wyoming as members of the Mountain West Conference. They finished the season 9–24, 2–16 in Mountain West play to finish in last place. As the 11 seed, they upset Colorado State and Nevada to reach the semifinals of the Mountain West tournament where they lost to Utah State. They became the first ever 11 seed to win a game at the Mountain West tournament.

On March 9, 2020, head coach Allen Edwards was fired. He finished at Wyoming with a four-year record of 60–76.

Previous season
The Cowboys finished the 2018–19 season 8–24, 4–14 in Mountain West play to finish in tenth place. They lost to New Mexico in the first round of the Mountain West tournament. They did not compete in a post-season tournament.

Offseason

Departures

Incoming transfers

2019 recruiting class

Media Day

The Mountain West Men's Basketball Media Day was held at Green Valley Ranch in Henderson, Nevada on October 15, 2019. Wyoming was picked to finish 10th in the conference, ahead of only San Jose State. No Wyoming players were selected to the preseason All-Conference team.

Roster

Statistics

Schedule and results

|-
!colspan=9 style=| Exhibition

|-
!colspan=9 style=| Regular season

|-
!colspan=9 style=| Mountain West tournament

Source

References

Wyoming Cowboys basketball seasons
Wyoming
Wyoming Cowboys bask
Wyoming Cowboys bask